The Munster Senior Football Championship, known simply as the Munster Championship and shortened to Munster SFC, is an annual inter-county Gaelic football competition organised by the Munster Council of the Gaelic Athletic Association (GAA). It is the highest inter-county Gaelic football competition in the province of Munster, and has been contested every year, bar one, since the 1888 championship.

The final, currently held on the fourth Saturday in June, serves as the culmination of a series of games played during May and June, and the results determine which team receives the Munster Cup. The championship has always been played on a straight knockout basis whereby once a team loses they are eliminated from the championship.

The Munster Championship is an integral part of the wider GAA Football All-Ireland Senior Championship. The winners of the Munster final, like their counterparts in Connacht, Leinster and Ulster, are rewarded by advancing directly to the All-Ireland Super 8s. All other defeated teams advance to the All-Ireland Qualifiers or the second tier Tailteann Cup.

Six teams currently participate in the Munster Championship. The most successful team in Gaelic football, namely Kerry, play their provincial football in the Munster Championship and have won the title on a record 82 occasions while they have also claimed 37 All-Ireland titles.

The title has been won at least once by all six of the Munster counties, four of which have won the title more than once. The championship has been dominated by Kerry, and to a lesser extent Cork, who have won the title every year since 1936, with the exception of victories by Tipperary in 2020 and Clare in 1992. Kerry are the current champions

Current team details

History

Development
Following the foundation of the Gaelic Athletic Association in 1884, new rules for Gaelic football and hurling were drawn up and published in the United Irishman newspaper. In 1886, county committees began to be established, with several counties affiliating over the next few years. The GAA ran its inaugural All-Ireland Senior Football Championship in 1887. The decision to establish that first championship was influenced by several factors. Firstly, inter-club contests in 1885 and 1886 were wildly popular and began to draw huge crowds. Clubs started to travel across the country to play against each other and these matches generated intense interest as the newspapers began to speculate which teams might be considered the best in the country. Secondly, although the number of clubs was growing, many were slow to affiliate to the Association, leaving it short of money. Establishing a central championship held the prospect of enticing GAA clubs to process their affiliations, just as the establishment of the FA Cup had done much in the 1870s to promote the development of the Football Association in England. The championships were open to all affiliated clubs who would first compete in county-based competitions, to be run by local county committees. The winners of each county championship would then proceed to represent that county in the All-Ireland series. For the first and only time in its history the All-Ireland Championship used an open draw format. Six teams entered the first championship, however, this number increased to nine in 1888. Because of this, and in an effort to reduce travelling costs, the GAA decided to introduce provincial championships.

Beginnings
The inaugural Munster Championship featured Clare, Cork, Limerick, Tipperary and Waterford. Cork and Tipperary contested the very first match on Sunday 27 May 1888, as part of a hurling-football double-header between the counties at Buttevant. Clare defeated Limerick in the first semi-final, however, Limerick were later awarded the game as Clare champions Newmarket-on-Fergus used players from other clubs to supplement their team. Such a format was not yet allowed. The inaugural Munster final between Tipperary and Limerick was to be played on Saturday 10 November 1888, however, no game was played as Tipperary received a walkover from Limerick.

Postponements, disqualifications, objections, withdrawals and walkovers were regular occurrences during the initial years of the championship. Kerry became the sixth and final team to enter the championship in 1889. On Sunday 6 October 1889, the very first Munster final took place. Tipperary won their first title on the field of play after a 1–02 to 0–03 defeat of Cork. Since then the championship title has been awarded every year, except in 1921 when the championship was cancelled due to the ongoing Civil War.

Team dominance
The first 15 years of the Munster Championship saw the most equitable era in its history with five of the six participating teams claiming the title. Cork led the way by claiming seven titles, closely followed by five for Tipperary, who also became the first team to retain the title. Limerick, Waterford and Kerry all claimed one title apiece during this era. In winning the 1903 Munster final, Kerry claimed the first of a new record of three successive titles and set in train a level of championship dominance that continues to the present day. This record was bested in each of the following decades with Kerry winning four-a-in-a-row between 1912 and 1915, five-in-a-row between 1923 and 1927, six-in-a-row between 1929 and 1934, seven-in-a-row between 1936 and 1942 and eight-in-a-row between 1958 and 1965. The dominance continued with Kerry claiming 20 of the 25 available Munster Championship titles between 1958 and 1982. Since the turn of the 20th century, Cork had claimed titles in almost every decade, including several back-to-back successes, but had never enjoyed a prolonged period of dominance. Cork won the 1987 Munster final, bringing an end to a run of success by a Kerry team that has since come to be regarded as the greatest of all time and securing the first of seven Munster Championship titles over the following nine seasons. For the first time in 100 years, Cork ended the nineties as the "team of the decade" after winning five Munster Championship titles in total. The first two decades of the 21st century has seen Kerry win 15 of a possible 20 Munster Championship titles.

Format
The Munster Championship has always been a knockout tournament whereby once a team is defeated they are eliminated from the championship. In the early years the pairings were drawn at random and there was no seeding. Each match was played as a single leg. If a match ended in a draw there was a replay. Drawn replays were settled with extra time; however, if both sides were still level at the end of extra time a second replay took place and so on until a winner was found. Extra-time was eventually adopted in the event of a draw for all championship games except the final.

The dominance of Kerry and, to a lesser extent, Cork led to both these teams being seeded on opposite sides of the championship draw. This was later viewed as a mean of penalising the other "weaker" teams. While it might be possible to beat one of these teams it was deemed near impossible to beat the two strongest teams in the province in a single championship season. This practice was eventually abolished with a return to the open draw in advance of the 1992 championship, which eventually saw Clare become the first "non-traditional" champions since 1935.

The Munster Council abandoned the open draw and returned to a system of seeding both Cork and Kerry on opposite sides before the 2008 championship. After an outcry, the open draw was reinstated in 2009 after just one season of seeding. The policy of seeding Cork and Kerry returned once again in 2013, however, it was abandoned after just one season and the open draw has remained in place ever since.

The Munster Championship has always been an integral part of the All-Ireland Senior Football Championship. Between 1888 and 2000 the Munster final winners automatically qualified for the All-Ireland semi-final. The introduction of the All-Ireland Qualifiers system in 2001 allowed the five defeated teams a second chance of qualifying the All-Ireland Championship, while the Munster champions received a bye to the All-Ireland quarter-final.

 Until 1952 usually an open draw 
 1953–1964 Limerick didn't take part expect in 1955 Limerick were apporoved to host Waterford but withdraw.
 1954 Clare skipped a year.
 1965 Cork and Kerry byes to semi-finals.
 1966 Kerry and Limerick byes to semi-finals.
 1967–1979 Seeded draw meaning Cork and Kerry only allowed to meet in the final.
 1980 Two First round games, One Quarter-final, one Semi-final and Kerry bye to the final.
 1981–1990 Seeded draw meaning Cork and Kerry only allowed to meet in the final.
 1991–1996 Open draw straight forward.
 1997–1998 One First round game, One Quarter-final and two Semi-finals.
 1999–2007 Open draw straight forward.
 2008 Seeded draw meaning Cork and Kerry only allowed to meet in the final.
 2009–2013 Open draw straight forward.
 2014 Seeded draw meaning Cork and Kerry only allowed to meet in the final.
 2015–2022 Open draw but two teams reach final are byes to semi-final.
 2022 Two First round games, One Quarter-final, one Semi-final and Kerry bye to the final due to 1 sided games in 2021 and 2022.

Current format

Overview
The Munster Championship is a single elimination tournament. Each team is afforded only one defeat before being eliminated from the championship. Pairings for matches are drawn at random and there is currently no seeding. Each match is played as a single leg. If a match is drawn there is a period of extra time, however, if both sides are still level at the end of extra time a replay takes place and so on until a winner is found.

Progression

Qualification for subsequent competitions
As of the 2020 championship, qualification for the All-Ireland Championship will change due to the creation of a tier 2 championship known as the Tailteann Cup. The Munster champions will continue to automatically qualify for the All-Ireland Super 8s. National League Division 3 and 4 teams who fail to reach the Munster final will automatically qualify for the Tailteann Cup. All other teams from Division 1 and 2 will progress to the All-Ireland Qualifiers. The straightforward open draw will reverted for 2021 season due to Tipperary winning.

Venues

History
Munster Championship matches were traditionally played at neutral venues or at a location that was deemed to be halfway between the two participants; however, all of the teams eventually came to home and away agreements. Every second meeting between these teams is played at the home venue of one of them.

While the six county grounds have regularly been used for championship matches in recent times, smaller club grounds have historically been used for games which may not have had such a high-profile. These grounds include: Ned Hall Park in Clonmel, FitzGerald Park in Kilmallock, Páirc na nGael in Askeaton, Páirc Mac Gearailt in Fermoy, Hennessy Memorial Park in Milltown Malbay and Frank Sheehy Park in Listowel.

Attendances
Stadium attendances are a significant source of regular income for the Munster Council and for the teams involved. For the 2019 championship, average attendances were 6,146 with a total aggregate attendance figure of 30,731. Excluding the final, these figures revealed a drop of 49% recorded from those through the turnstiles the previous year.

Managers

Managers in the Munster Championship are involved in the day-to-day running of the team, including the training, team selection, and sourcing of players from the club championships. Their influence varies from county-to-county and is related to the individual county boards. From 2018, all inter-county head coaches must be Award 2 qualified. The manager is assisted by a team of two or three selectors and an extensive backroom team consisting of various coaches. Prior to the development of the concept of a manager in the 1970s, teams were usually managed by a team of selectors with one member acting as chairman.

Trophy and medals

At the end of the Munster final, the winning team is presented with a trophy. The Munster Cup is held by the winning team until the following year's final. Traditionally, the presentation is made at a special rostrum in the stand where GAA and political dignitaries and special guests view the match.

The cup is decorated with ribbons in the colours of the winning team. During the game the cup actually has both teams' sets of ribbons attached and the runners-up ribbons are removed before the presentation. The winning captain accepts the cup on behalf of his team before giving a short speech. Individual members of the winning team then have an opportunity to come to the rostrum to lift the cup.

The present Munster Cup was first used in 1928, when it was donated by the Munster Council. In 2013, there was a debate around naming the cup in honour of a former player or administrator, however, this was rejected. In March 2021, the Munster Council deferred a decision to name the trophy, with Michael Hogan and Páidí Ó Sé the two names proposed.

In accordance with GAA rules, the Munster Council awards up to 26 gold medals to the winners of the Munster final.

Sponsorship
Since 1994, the Munster Championship has been sponsored. The sponsor has usually been able to determine the championship's sponsorship name.

List of winners by county
A golden background denotes years in which the Munster champions also won the All-Ireland Championship.

List of Munster finals

Statistics

Most recent championship meetings

Teams by decade
The most successful team of each decade, judged by number of Munster Senior Football Championship titles, is as follows:

 1880s: 2 for Tipperary (1888–89)
 1890s: 6 for Cork (1890-91-93-94-97-99)
 1900s: 5 for Kerry (1903-04-05-08-09)
 1910s: 6 for Kerry (1910-12-13-14-15-19)
 1920s: 6 for Kerry (1923-24-25-26-27-29)
 1930s: 9 for Kerry (1930-31-32-33-34-36-37-38-39)
 1940s: 7 for Kerry (1940-41-42-44-46-47-48)
 1950s: 7 for Kerry (1950-51-53-54-55-58-59)
 1960s: 8 for Kerry (1960-61-62-63-64-65-68-69)
 1970s: 7 for Kerry (1970-72-75-76-77-78-79)
 1980s: 6 for Kerry (1980-81-82-84-85-86)
 1990s: 5 for Cork (1990-93-94-95-99)
 2000s: 6 for Kerry (2000-01-03-04-05-07)
 2010s: 9 for Kerry (2010-11-13-14-15-16-17-18-19)

Other records

Gaps

Longest gaps between successive Munster titles:
 85 years: Tipperary (1935–2020)
 75 years: Clare (1917–1992)
 16 years: Tipperary (1902–1918)
 15 years: Cork (1928–1943)
 13 years: Tipperary (1922–1935)
 12 years: Cork (1916–1928)
 11 years: Kerry (1892–1903)

Longest undefeated run
The record for the longest unbeaten run stands at 18 games held by Kerry. They achieved this feat on three separate occasions: 1936–1943, 1958–1966 and 1975–1983.

Players

Top scorers

All time

By year

Most appearances

Record Munster medal winners

Team progress since 2001
Below is a record of each county's performance since the introduction of the qualifier system to the All-Ireland series in 2001. Qualifiers did not occur from 2020 onwards due to the impact of the COVID-19 pandemic on Gaelic games.

Key

See also
 All-Ireland Senior Football Championship
 Leinster Senior Football Championship
 Ulster Senior Football Championship
 Connacht Senior Football Championship

References

External links
Munster GAA website
Munster Senior Football Championship fixtures GAA.ie
Roll of Honour, Munster Senior Football Championship GAA.ie
List of winning teams, Munster Senior Football Championship GAA.ie

 
1
3